The Queen Elizabeth II Jubilee Hospital (QE II) is a public hospital located in Coopers Plains, Brisbane, Australia. The hospital was officially opened on 26 September 1980.

The hospital originally was developed to be a site for future expansion of the Mater Children's Hospital, a centre for servicing the needs of the Commonwealth Games held nearby and a range of other initiatives that never eventuated. At one point in its history it was almost closed but after vigorous protests by the local community it was reopened and continues as an elective surgical hospital and an active general medical facility.

In 2007 it became part of the newly formed Brisbane South Health District and the QEII Hospital Health Service District was abolished. The district included four hospital services – Beaudesert, Logan, Bayside and QEII.

There was also a proposal to build a stand-alone 'surgicentre' at QEII to provide for increased elective surgery. The eventual outcome was a range of internal redevelopments including an enhanced outpatients area, a new ward, an additional operating theatre and considerable infrastructure upgrades.

In January 2008 it was announced that the Federal Government would provide funding of $2 Billion for eight medical super clinics as a plan to improve public health services. The QEII Hospital was to be one of the eight hospitals to receive the super clinic boost.
By March 2009 no further development of a medical super clinic at QEII had occurred though it was still actively rumoured as a Commonwealth Government initiative. By 2014 there were no longer any plans for a super clinic at QEII.

In late 2008 the Southside Health District and the Princess Alexandra Hospital Health District merged and it was renamed Metrosouth Health Service District.

The QEII as it is known continues to function as before, though the former Community Health Services administrative area was closed and as of February 2009 and an additional ward was opened to increase the elective surgical capacity of the facility.

Clinical departments
Orthopaedic Surgery, Director Dr Christopher Bell
Gynaecology, Director Dr Anton Marineanu
General Surgery, A/Director Dr Geoff Mudouia
General Medicine, A/Director Dr Mandeep Mathur
Intensive Care, Director Dr David Stewart
Geriatrics and Rehabilitation, Director Dr Amanda Siller
Emergency Medicine (non-trauma), Director Dr Edward Pink
Anaesthetics and Pain Management, Director Dr Carolyn Wills
Urology and Urodynamics, Director Dr Tim Smith
Library Manager, Dr Jane Simon, Library Technician Meredith Lewis

The clinical activities of the hospital centre around lower limb orthopaedic surgery including knee and hip replacements and arthroplasty, elective gynaecological surgery, urodynamics and urological surgery, aged care and rehabilitation as well as a range of general medical and surgical services.

Management
Executive Director, Adrianne Belchamber
Director of Medical Services (Medical Superintendent), Dr Bill Kingswell
Director of Surgical Services, Dr Christopher Bell
Director of Emergency and Medical Services, Dr Michael Daly
Director of Nursing Services, Nicki Dennis
Director of Nursing, Surgical Services, Amanda Garner
Director of Nursing, Medical Services, Julie Finucane
Director of Allied Health, Leo Ross
Director of Physiotherapy, Mark Nelson
Director of Occupational Therapy, Ruth Cox
Director of Pharmacy, John Parke
Director of Dietetics, Sally Courtice
Director of Speech Pathology, Katharine Morley-Davies
Manager, Finance, Joe Byrne CPA
Manager, Human Resources, Andrew Riddell
Manager, Corporate Services, Lorraine Munn
Director of Health Information Management Service, Ava Wong
Manager, Quality & Safety, Bernie O’Brien

References

Hospital buildings completed in 1980
Hospitals in Brisbane
Hospitals established in 1980
1980 establishments in Australia